Xylota is a Holarctic genus of hoverflies similar in structure to the related genera Chalcosyrphus and Brachypalpoides. As the larvae are saprophytic they're usually found in rotting wood. The adult flies are generally associated with woodland and woodland edges and can often be seen running over the upper sides of leaves. Unlike other syrphids the adults of many species rarely visit flowers preferring instead to gather pollen from leaf surfaces. 
There are over 100 described species of which 12 can be found in Europe. Seven species have been recorded in Britain. Identification of species has been difficult and identifiction by photographs is risky.

Species

Xylota abiens Meigen, 1822
Xylota abosa Séguy, 1948
Xylota aeneimaculata Meijere, 1908
Xylota amaculata Yang & Cheng, 1998
Xylota amylostigma Yang & Cheng, 1998
Xylota analis Williston, 1887
Xylota angustata Hippa, 1978
Xylota angustiventris Loew, 1866
Xylota annulifera Bigot, 1884
Xylota argoi Shannon, 1926
Xylota armipes (Sack, 1922)
Xylota atricoloris Mutin, 1987
Xylota atroparva Hippa, 1974
Xylota auronitens Brunetti, 1908
Xylota azurea (Fluke, 1953)
Xylota barbata Loew, 1864
Xylota bicincta (Szilády, 1940)
Xylota bicolor Loew, 1864
Xylota bimaculata (Shiraki, 1930)
Xylota bistriata Brunetti, 1915
Xylota boninensis Shiraki, 1963
Xylota brachygaster Williston, 1892
Xylota brachypalpoides (Shiraki, 1930)
Xylota brunettii Curran, 1928
Xylota brunnipes Shiraki, 1968
Xylota caeruleiventris Zetterstedt, 1838
Xylota caerulifrons Bigot, 1884
Xylota carbonaria Brunetti, 1923
Xylota chalcopyga Hippa, 1978
Xylota coeruleopicta Hippa, 1978
Xylota conformis Walker, 1857
Xylota confusa Shannon, 1926
Xylota coquilletti Hervé-Bazin, 1914
Xylota cupreiventris Brunetti, 1923
Xylota cuprina Bigot, 1885
Xylota cupripurpura Huo, Zhang & Zheng, 2004
Xylota danieli Mutin & Ichige, 2014
Xylota discolor (Hippa, 1985)
Xylota dolini (Kassebeer, 2000)
Xylota ejuncida Say, 1824
Xylota ferratus (Hippa, 1985)
Xylota filipjevi (Stackelberg, 1952)
Xylota flavifacies (Shiraki, 1930)
Xylota flavifrons Walker, 1849
Xylota flavipes (Sack, 1927)
Xylota flavitarsis Macquart, 1846
Xylota flavitibia Bigot, 1884
Xylota florum (Fabricius, 1805)
Xylota flukei (Curran, 1941)
Xylota fo Hull, 1944
Xylota formosana Matsumura, 1916
Xylota frontalis (Shiraki & Edashige, 1953)
Xylota furcata Hippa, 1982
Xylota hancocki Curran, 1927
Xylota heinrichi (Hippa, 1986)
Xylota hinei (Curran, 1941)
Xylota hisamatsui (Shiraki & Edashige, 1953)
Xylota honghe Huo, Zhang & Zheng, 2004
Xylota ignava (Panzer, 1798)
Xylota impensa He & Zhang, 1997
Xylota iriana Hippa, 1978
Xylota isokoae Shiraki, 1968
Xylota jakutorum Bagatshanova, 1980
Xylota lapsa (Mutin, 1990)
Xylota lea Hippa, 1978
Xylota lenta Meigen, 1822
Xylota lovetti Curran, 1925
Xylota maculabstrusa Yang & Cheng, 1998
Xylota makiana (Shiraki, 1930)
Xylota meigeniana Stackelberg, 1964
Xylota micrura (Curran, 1941)
Xylota mimica (Hull, 1941)
Xylota morna Curran, 1931
Xylota naknek Shannon, 1926
Xylota nartshukae Bagatshanova, 1984
Xylota neavei (Hippa, 1978)
Xylota nebulosa Johnson, 1921
Xylota nigroaenescens Rondani, 1875
Xylota nitidula (Fluke, 1939)
Xylota novaeguineae Hippa, 1978
Xylota nursei Brunetti, 1923
Xylota ouelleti (Curran, 1941)
Xylota pectinatus (Hippa, 1985)
Xylota pendleburyi Curran, 1928
Xylota penicillata Brunetti, 1923
Xylota perarmata (Hippa, 1985)
Xylota pernigra (Hippa, 1985)
Xylota philippinica Mutin & Gilbert, 1999
Xylota pilosus (Hippa, 1985)
Xylota planiformis (Hull, 1941)
Xylota plumipes (Hippa, 1985)
Xylota processifera Hippa, 1978
Xylota protrudens (Hippa, 1985)
Xylota puella Becker, 1921
Xylota quadrimaculata Loew, 1866
Xylota rufiseta Hippa, 1982
Xylota satyrus (Keiser, 1971)
Xylota scutellarmata Lovett, 1919
Xylota segnis (Linnaeus, 1758)
Xylota semulater (Harris, 1780)
Xylota setigera Hippa, 1982
Xylota setosa (Keiser, 1971)
Xylota sibirica (Loew, 1871)
Xylota sichotana Mutin, 1985
Xylota silvicola Mutin, 1987
Xylota simplex (Shiraki, 1930)
Xylota spinipes Curran, 1928
Xylota splendens Shiraki, 1968
Xylota spurivulgaris Yang & Cheng, 1998
Xylota stenogaster Williston, 1892
Xylota steyskali Thompson, 1975
Xylota stylata Hull, 1944
Xylota subfasciata Loew, 1866
Xylota suecica (Ringdahl, 1943)
Xylota sylvarum (Linnaeus, 1758)
Xylota taibaishanensis He & Chu, 1997
Xylota talyshensis Hauser, 1998
Xylota tarda Meigen, 1822
Xylota tenulonga Yang & Cheng, 1998
Xylota triangularis Zetterstedt, 1838
Xylota tridens (Hippa, 1985)
Xylota tuberculata (Curran, 1941)
Xylota uluguruensis (Hippa, 1978)
Xylota umbrosa Violovitsh, 1975
Xylota unica Violovich, 1977
Xylota violaceus (Hippa, 1985)
Xylota vulcana (Hippa, 1978)
Xylota willistoni Goot, 1964
Xylota xanthocnema Collin, 1939
Xylota zeya Mutin & Gilbert, 1999

References

External links
 Images representing Xylota

Hoverfly genera
Taxa named by Johann Wilhelm Meigen
Diptera of North America
Diptera of Europe
Diptera of Asia
Diptera of Australasia
Diptera of Africa
Eristalinae